This list of Internet censorship and surveillance by country provides information on the types and levels of Internet censorship and surveillance that is occurring in countries around the world.

Classifications
Detailed country by country information on Internet censorship and surveillance is provided in the Freedom on the Net reports from Freedom House, by the OpenNet Initiative, by Reporters Without Borders, and in the Country Reports on Human Rights Practices from the U.S. State Department Bureau of Democracy, Human Rights, and Labor. The ratings produced by several of these organizations are summarized below as well as in the Censorship by country article.

Freedom on the Net reports
The Freedom on the Net reports provide analytical reports and numerical ratings regarding the state of Internet freedom for countries worldwide. The countries surveyed represent a sample with a broad range of geographical diversity and levels of economic development, as well as varying levels of political and media freedom. The surveys ask a set of questions designed to measure each country's level of Internet and digital media freedom, as well as the access and openness of other digital means of transmitting information, particularly mobile phones and text messaging services.

Results are presented for three areas:
 Obstacles to Access: infrastructural and economic barriers to access; governmental efforts to block specific applications or technologies; legal and ownership control over internet and mobile phone access providers.
 Limits on Content: filtering and blocking of websites; other forms of censorship and self-censorship; manipulation of content; the diversity of online news media; and usage of digital media for social and political activism.
 Violations of User Rights: legal protections and restrictions on online activity; surveillance and limits on privacy; and repercussions for online activity, such as legal prosecution, imprisonment, physical attacks, or other forms of harassment.

The results from the three areas are combined into a total score for a country (from 0 for best to 100 for worst) and countries are rated as "Free" (0 to 30), "Partly Free" (31 to 60), or "Not Free" (61 to 100) based on the totals.

Starting in 2009 Freedom House has produced nine editions of the report.
There was no report in 2010. The reports generally cover the period from June through May.

{| class="wikitable"
|+ Freedom on the Net survey results
!          !! 2009 !! 2011 !! 2012 !! 2013 !! 2014 !! 2015 !! 2016 !! 2017 !! 2018

|-
|| Countries    ||            15       ||            37                   || 47        ||        60         ||    65              || 65        || 65        || 65        || 65
|-
|| Free         ||   4 (27%) ||   8 (22%)             || 14 (30%)  ||        17 (29%)   ||    19 (29%)        || 18 (28%)  || 17 (26%)  || 16 (25%)  || 15 (23%)
|-
|| Partly free  ||   7 (47%) ||            18 (49%)             || 20 (43%)  ||        29 (48%)   ||    31 (48%)        || 28 (43%)  || 28 (43%)  || 28 (43%)  || 30 (46%)
|-
|| Not free     ||   4 (27%) ||            11 (30%)             || 13 (28%)  ||        14 (23%)   ||    15 (23%)        || 19 (29%)  || 20 (31%)  || 21 (32%)  || 20 (31%)
|-
|| Improved     ||          n/a        ||   5 (33%)             || 11 (31%)  ||        12 (26%)   ||    12 (18%)        || 15 (23%)  || 34 (52%)  || 32 (49%)  || 19 (29%)
|-
|| Declined     ||          n/a        ||   9 (60%)             || 17 (47%)  ||        28 (60%)   ||    36 (55%)        || 32 (49%)  || 14 (22%)  || 13 (20%)  || 26 (40%)

|-
|| No change    ||          n/a        ||   1   (7%)  ||   8 (22%) ||   7 (15%) || 17 (26%)           || 18 (28%) || 17 (26%)  || 20 (31%)  || 20 (31%)
|}

OpenNet Initiative

In a series of reports issued between 2007 and 2013 the OpenNet Initiative (ONI) classified the magnitude of censorship or filtering occurring in a country in four areas of activity.

The magnitude or level of censorship was classified as follows:
Pervasive: A large portion of content in several categories is blocked.
Substantial: A number of categories are subject to a medium level of filtering or many categories are subject to a low level of filtering.
Selective: A small number of specific sites are blocked or filtering targets a small number of categories or issues.
Suspected: It is suspected, but not confirmed, that Web sites are being blocked.
No evidence: No evidence of blocked Web sites, although other forms of controls may exist.

The classifications were done for the following areas of activity:
Political: Views and information in opposition to those of the current government or related to human rights, freedom of expression, minority rights, and religious movements.
Social: Views and information perceived as offensive or as socially sensitive, often related to sexuality, gambling, or illegal drugs and alcohol.
Conflict/security: Views and information related to armed conflicts, border disputes, separatist movements, and militant groups.
Internet tools: e-mail, Internet hosting, search, translation, and Voice-over Internet Protocol (VoIP) services, and censorship or filtering circumvention methods.
Due to legal concerns the ONI does not check for filtering of child pornography and because their classifications focus on technical filtering, they do not include other types of censorship.

Through 2010 the OpenNet Initiative had documented Internet filtering by governments in over forty countries worldwide. The level of filtering was classified in 26 countries in 2007 and in 25 countries in 2009. Of the 41 separate countries classified in these two years, seven were found to show no evidence of filtering (Egypt, France, Germany, India, the United Kingdom, and the United States), while one was found to engage in pervasive filtering in all areas (China), 13 were found to engage in pervasive filtering in one or more areas, and 34 were found to engage in some level of filtering in one or more areas. Of the 10 countries classified in both 2007 and 2009, one reduced its level of filtering (Pakistan), five increased their level of filtering (Azerbaijan, Belarus, Kazakhstan, South Korea, and Uzbekistan), and four maintained the same level of filtering (China, Iran, Myanmar, and Tajikistan).

In December 2014 ONI announced that:
After a decade of collaboration in the study and documentation of Internet filtering and control mechanisms around the world, the OpenNet Initiative partners will no longer carry out research under the ONI banner. The ONI website, including all reports and data, will be maintained indefinitely to allow continued public access to their entire archive of published work and data.

ONI's summarized global Internet filtering data was last updated on 20 September 2013.

Reporters Without Borders

RWB Enemies of the Internet and Countries under Surveillance lists

RWB Special report on Internet Surveillance

On 12 March 2013 Reporters Without Borders published a Special report on Internet Surveillance. The report includes two new lists:
 a list of "State Enemies of the Internet", countries whose governments are involved in active, intrusive surveillance of news providers, resulting in grave violations of freedom of information and human rights; and
 a list of "Corporate Enemies of the Internet", companies that sell products that are liable to be used by governments to violate human rights and freedom of information.

The five "State Enemies of the Internet" named in March 2013 are: Bahrain, China, Iran, Syria, and Vietnam.

The five "Corporate Enemies of the Internet" named in March 2013 are: Amesys (France), Blue Coat Systems (U.S.), Gamma (UK and Germany), Hacking Team (Italy), and Trovicor (Germany).

Country Reports on Human Rights Practices

Country Reports on Human Rights Practices is an annual series of reports on human rights conditions in countries throughout the world. Among other topics the reports include information on freedom of speech and the press including Internet freedom; freedom of assembly and association; and arbitrary interference with privacy, family, home, or correspondence.

The reports are prepared by the Bureau of Democracy, Human Rights, and Labor within the United States Department of State. The reports cover internationally recognized individual, civil, political, and worker rights, as set forth in the Universal Declaration of Human Rights. The first report was issued in 1977 covering the year 1976.

Internet censorship and surveillance by continent

Africa

The Americas

Asia

Europe

Oceania

See also
Global Internet Freedom Task Force – an initiative of the U.S. Department of State
Internet censorship in the Arab Spring
IFEX – monitors Internet censorship worldwide
Tunisia Monitoring Group
Reporters sans frontières (Reporters Without Borders)
The Web Index by the World Wide Web Foundation, a measure of the World Wide Web’s contribution to social, economic and political progress in countries across the world.

References
 
  This article incorporates licensed material from the Country Profiles, Regional Overviews, and Filtering Maps sections of the OpenNet Initiative web site.

External links
 OpenNet Initiative web site.
 Reporters Without Borders web site.
 "Internet Monitor", a research project of the Berkman Center for Internet & Society at Harvard University to evaluate, describe, and summarize the means, mechanisms, and extent of Internet access, content controls and activity around the world.
 "Open Observatory of Network Interference (OONI)", A free software project that detects censorship and traffic manipulation on a global scale.
 "Mapping Digital Media: Reports and Publications", Open Society Foundations.
 "Web Index", a composite statistic designed and produced by the World Wide Web Foundation, is a multi-dimensional measure of the World Wide Web’s contribution to development and human rights globally. It covered 86 countries as of 2014, incorporating indicators that assess universal access, freedom and openness, relevant content, and empowerment, which indicate economic, social, and political impacts of the Web.
 Internet Censorship, A Comparative Study, Jonathan Werve, Global Integrity, 19 February 2008, puts online censorship in cross-country context.

 
Computer surveillance